Harold B. Gross was a United States lawyer who served as General Counsel of the Navy from April 30, 1949 until August 30, 1953.

General Counsels of the United States Navy
Year of birth missing
Year of death missing